The Clinic is a 1982 Australian film produced by Robert Le Tet and Bob Weis and directed by David Stevens. The film is a comedy/drama describing a day in a Melbourne VD clinic focusing on four doctors and their patients. It was filmed in Melbourne, Australia and Deniliquin, Australia. It was distributed by Village Roadshow

Award nominations
In 1983 the film received 2 AFI Award nominations for Best Actress in a Supporting Role (Pat Evison) and Best Original Screenplay (Greg Millin).

Cast
Chris Haywood as Dr. Eric Linden
Simon Burke as Paul
Gerda Nicolson as Linda
Rona McLeod as Dr. Carol Young
Suzanne Roylance as Patty
Veronica Lang as Nancy
Pat Evison as Alda
Max Bruch as Hassad
Gabrielle Hartley as Gillian
Jane Clifton as Sharon

Box office
 The Clinic grossed $414,000 at the box office in Australia, which is equivalent to $1,092,960
in 2009 dollars.

See also
Cinema of Australia

References

Further reading

External links

The Clinic at Oz Movies
The Clinic at the National Film and Sound Archive
PlanetOut film review
Seabrook House location of the fictional VD clinic at 573 Lonsdale St, Melbourne VIC 3000, Australia.

1982 films
1982 comedy-drama films
Australian comedy-drama films
Films shot in Melbourne
1980s English-language films
1980s Australian films
English-language comedy-drama films